Romanogobio is a genus of cyprinid fish found in Europe and Asia.

Species
Currently, 18 described species are in this genus, including the extinct R. antipai:
 Romanogobio albipinnatus (Lukasch, 1933) (white-finned gudgeon)
 Romanogobio amplexilabris (Bănărescu & Nalbant, 1973)
 †Romanogobio antipai (Bănărescu, 1953) (Danube delta gudgeon)
 Romanogobio banaticus (Bănărescu, 1960)
 Romanogobio belingi (Slastenenko, 1934) (northern whitefin gudgeon)
 Romanogobio benacensis (Pollini (ru), 1816)
 Romanogobio ciscaucasicus (L. S. Berg, 1932) (North Caucasian long-barbelled gudgeon)
 Romanogobio elimeius (Kattoulas, Stephanidis & Economidis, 1973)
 Romanogobio johntreadwelli (Bănărescu & Nalbant, 1973)
 Romanogobio kesslerii (Dybowski, 1862) (Kessler's gudgeon)
 Romanogobio macropterus (Kamensky, 1901)
 Romanogobio parvus Naseka & Freyhof, 2004
 Romanogobio pentatrichus Naseka & Bogutskaya, 1998 (Kuban long-barbelled gudgeon)
 Romanogobio persus (Günther, 1899) (Kura gudgeon)
 Romanogobio tanaiticus Naseka, 2001 (Don whitefin gudgeon)
 Romanogobio tenuicorpus (T. Mori, 1934) (Amur whitefin gudgeon)
 Romanogobio uranoscopus (Agassiz, 1828) (Danubian long-barbelled gudgeon)
 Romanogobio vladykovi (P. W. Fang, 1943) (Danube whitefin gudgeon)

References

 
Freshwater fish genera
Ray-finned fish genera
Taxa named by Petre Mihai Bănărescu